The 1866 Petersfield by-election was held on Monday 23 July 1866.

The previous incumbent Sir William Jolliffe had been raised to the peerage as Baron Hylton, of Hylton in the County Palatine of Durham and of Petersfield in the County of Southampton.

The election took place at Petersfield Town Hall, then in front of St Peter's Church. The Mayor S.W. Seaward presided and called for someone to propose "A fit and proper person to represent the town in parliament". The MP for Winchester, John Bonham-Carter proposed William Nicholson with a Mr Elkington seconding. There being no other candidate, Nicholson was declared elected.

References 

By-elections to the Parliament of the United Kingdom in Hampshire constituencies
July 1866 events
Petersfield
Unopposed by-elections to the Parliament of the United Kingdom in English constituencies
1866 elections in the United Kingdom
1866 in England
19th century in Hampshire